"The Wonderful World of the Young" is a song written by Sid Tepper and Roy C. Bennett, and first recorded by American singer Andy Williams, whose version reached No. 99 on the Billboard Hot 100 in March 1962. The following month, a version by British singer Danny Williams was more successful, peaking at No. 8 on the UK Singles Chart. 

Other versions have been recorded by Lawrence Welk, Phil Tate, and John Treacy Egan.

References

1962 songs
1962 singles
Andy Williams songs
Danny Williams (singer) songs
Songs written by Sid Tepper
Songs written by Roy C. Bennett
Columbia Records singles
His Master's Voice singles